Great Brak River, Groot Brak River, Groot Brak Rivier and similar titles may refer to:

 the Great Brak River (river), a river in the Western Cape province of South Africa
 Great Brak River (town), a town at the mouth of the river

See also 
 Little Brak River (disambiguation)
 Brak River